Hillwood High School is a public high school located in Nashville, Tennessee, and is part of the Metropolitan Nashville Public Schools (MNPS). Athletic teams are known as the Hilltoppers and the school colors are kelly green and white. Hillwood opened in 1959 and will close at the end of the 2022-23 school year as a replacement facility in the Bellevue community opens under the new name James Lawson High School.

Academics
Hillwood offers all levels of academics. Standard and honors level courses are available along with Advanced Placement and International Baccalaureate courses. Hillwood became one of the first IB World Schools in Tennessee in February 2004. It offers the Diploma Programme. Additionally, the Advancement Via Individual Determination (AVID) program is available. Hillwood is a Technology Site Demonstration school.

Athletics
There are many sports available for students to participate in. The Topper Athletic Club is a parent/faculty organization that helps support all sports teams. They generally meet once a month. All sporting events are overseen by the Tennessee Secondary School Athletic Association (TSSAA).

Sports at Hillwood High School include:
Baseball
Basketball (boys & girls)
Bowling (boys & girls)
Cheerleading
Cross Country (boys & girls)
Football
Golf (boys & girls)
Soccer (boys & girls)
Softball
Tennis (boys & girls)
Track (boys & girls)
Volleyball
Wrestling
Dance Team

Team accomplishments
The football team was state championship contender in the 1990s and early 2000s before their move from AAAA (4A) to AAAAA (5A), which was Tennessee's highest class. Now there are six classes and Hillwood is in 5A.

The baseball team won Hillwood's first state championship in any sport when they won the TSSAA AAA state championship over Maryville High School in 1977. William Brennan, who would later be a Major League pitcher for the Los Angeles Dodgers and Chicago Cubs, played for Hillwood in 1981.

The basketball team was coached by Ricardo Patton in 1986–87. He later went on to coach college basketball at the NCAA Division I level for Colorado and later for Northern Illinois.

Rivals
Hillwood has a few sports rivals. Their main rivalry is with Hillsboro High School in the annual "Battle of the Hills". Other rivals include John Overton High School, Glencliff High School, McGavock High School, and Father Ryan High School.  Montgomery Bell Academy was previously a major rival as the schools are only two miles apart, but Hillwood has not been very competitive with that school since the public/private split.

Extracurricular activities and clubs
Marching Band
Concert Band
Piano
Chamber Choir
Dance
Music Understanding
Orchestra
Theater
Model United Nations
Youth in Government 
HOSA
DECA
Debate
Mock Trials
National Honor Society
International Thespian Society
Student Council
Student Government Association
Student Ambassadors
International Day
Latino Achievers
Gender and Sexuality Alliance
School newspaper, "The Topper Times"

External links

Public high schools in Tennessee
Schools in Nashville, Tennessee
1959 establishments in Tennessee